Two ships of the United States Navy have borne the name USS De Haven, in honor of Edwin J. De Haven, an American naval officer and explorer.

 , was a Fletcher-class destroyer, launched in 1942 and sunk in 1943.
 , was a Allen M. Sumner-class destroyer, launched in 1944 and struck in 1973, when she was transferred to South Korea and renamed Incheon. She was stricken and scrapped in 1993.

See also
 , a World War II hospital ship

United States Navy ship names